The Men's 15 kilometre classical competition at the FIS Nordic World Ski Championships 2019 was held on 20 and 27 February 2019. A qualification was held on 20 February.

Results

Qualification
The qualification was started on 20 February at 14:00.

Final
The final was started on 27 February at 14:00.

References

Men's 15 kilometre classical